Pristimantis renjiforum is a species of frogs in the family Strabomantidae.

It is endemic to Colombia.
Its natural habitat is tropical moist montane forests.
It is threatened by habitat loss.

References

renjiforum
Endemic fauna of Colombia
Amphibians of Colombia
Amphibians of the Andes
Amphibians described in 2000
Taxonomy articles created by Polbot